is a private junior college in Tochigi, Tochigi, Japan. The school was founded as a junior women's college in 1966 before it became coeducational 2004.

The college is affiliated with the Kokugakuin University located in Tokyo, Japan.

External links
 Official website 

Japanese junior colleges
Educational institutions established in 1966
Private universities and colleges in Japan
Universities and colleges in Tochigi Prefecture
1966 establishments in Japan